Nicoll Highway is a major arterial road in Singapore which links the junctions of Guillemard Road, Sims Way and Mountbatten Road in Kallang to the junctions of Esplanade Drive, Raffles Avenue and Stamford Road in the city. En route, it passes through the areas of Kallang, Kampong Glam and Marina Centre.

Despite what its name may suggest, the speed limit on the highway is less than that of an expressway. The highway also has traffic light junctions at some of its intersections with roads such as Bras Basah Road and Esplanade Drive, which are not found in expressways.

History

Etymology
The road was named after Sir John Fearns Nicoll, governor of the Colony of Singapore in the early 1950s, who played a major role in ensuring its construction.

Construction
Plans for the road were first floated up by the Singapore Improvement Trust in the late 1940s to relieve the heavy rush-hour traffic along Kallang Road and provide an alternative road to Katong and Changi. These plans were finalised in July 1953, with work on the first section of the road, a bridge across the Kallang and Rochor rivers, commencing construction in early 1954. Costing a total of $12 million, Nicoll Highway was opened by then-Chief Minister Lim Yew Hock on 17 August 1956. With the road's opening, traffic conditions were greatly improved, and travel times to the city area cut by 25 to 35 minutes.

By the 1960s, the then four-lane Nicoll Highway was found to be insufficient to carry rush-hour traffic. Consequently, an additional carriageway was added in 1965. This carriageway was used for city-bound traffic during the morning peak hours and for traffic in the opposite direction during the afternoon peak. It was claimed by the Straits Times that traffic congestion was significantly reduced after the opening of the reversible carriageway.

Nicoll Highway collapse

At approximately 3:30 p.m. Singapore Time (UTC+8:00) on 20 April 2004, a section of Nicoll Highway between Ophir Road and Merdeka Bridge collapsed, due to the failure of the retaining wall of the Circle line tunnel below it. This section of the road had to be closed for several months for repairs. All bus services going through that sector of Nicoll Highway had to be redirected. The road was re-opened in December later that year.

Landmarks
Some landmarks that can be seen along the road are:
 Civilian War Memorial
 Golden Mile Complex
 Golden Mile Tower
 Merdeka Bridge
 National Stadium
 One Raffles Link
 People's Association
 Shaw Towers
 Suntec City
 The Concourse
 The Gateway
 War Memorial Park

Interchange along Nicoll Highway

: Road names are ordered in the clockwise fashion starting from the top.

See also
 Expressways of Singapore
 Outer Ring Road System
 West Coast Highway, Singapore

References

External links

Roads in Singapore
Downtown Core (Singapore)
Kallang